Tun Abdul Aziz bin Abdul Majid (10 March 1908 – 10 May 1975) was the Yang di-Pertua Negeri of Malacca from 1971 to 1975. He also served as Menteri Besar in two states from 1952 until 1956.

Early life 
He was educated at Kajang High School, Kajang, Selangor.

In March 1948, he took the 'Second Deconshire Course' at Oxford University, United Kingdom.

Career 
He started his career as a teacher before appointed as Collector of Land Revenue, Assistant District Officer and District Officer. Later, he served as Assistant Secretary at the Selangor Local Commissioner's office. On 1 February 1948, he was again appointed as the First Secretary to the Selangor Government Secretary.

After studying in United Kingdom, he was appointed District Officer Teluk Anson (now Teluk Intan). He was later appointed as a Member of the State Assembly Negeri Sembilan and Assistant Secretary of Internal Security in the Defense Division

In 1952, he was appointed by Tunku Abdul Rahman as the first Menteri Besar of Negeri Sembilan. Then on 1 September 1955 he was appointed as Menteri Besar of Selangor.

In 1956, he was appointed to represent the kings in the Merdeka delegation to United Kingdom to discuss matters of defense Malaysia.

After retiring from politics, he was appointed as Yang di-Pertua Negeri Melaka and lived in the official residence Sri Melaka (now as a museum) until his death.

Honours

Honours of Malaysia
  : 
 Commander of the Order of the Defender of the Realm (PMN) – Tan Sri (1958)
 : 
 Grand Commander of the Order of the Defender of the Realm (SMN) – Tun (1972)
  :
  Knight Commander of the Order of the Crown of Kelantan (DPMK) – Dato' (1961)

Places named after him
Several places were named after him, including:
 Jalan Tun Abdul Aziz in Kajang, Selangor
 Tun Abdul Aziz Mosque in Petaling Jaya, Selangor
 Sekolah Kebangsaan Tun Abdul Aziz Majid in Hulu Langat, Selangor

References

 

1908 births
1975 deaths
Malaysian people of Malay descent
Malaysian Muslims
Yang di-Pertua Negeri of Malacca
Chief Ministers of Selangor
Selangor state executive councillors
Chief Ministers of Negeri Sembilan
Negeri Sembilan state executive councillors
Grand Commanders of the Order of the Defender of the Realm
Commanders of the Order of the Defender of the Realm